Tin Hau temples in Hong Kong are dedicated to Tin Hau (Mazu). Over 100 temples are dedicated (at least partially) to Tin Hau in Hong Kong. A list of these temples can be found below.

Famous temples

Famous Tin Hau temples in Hong Kong include:
 Tin Hau temple, located at 10 Tin Hau Temple Road, Causeway Bay, east of Victoria Park, in Eastern District, on Hong Kong Island. It is a declared monument. The temple has given its name to the MTR station serving it (Island line), and subsequently to the neighboring area of Tin Hau.
 The Tin Hau temple in Yau Ma Tei is also famous in Hong Kong. The public square, Yung Shue Tau before it is surrounded by the popular Temple Street night market.
 The Tin Hau Temple at Joss House Bay is considered the most sacred. Built in 1266, it is the oldest and the largest Tin Hau Temple in Hong Kong. It is a Grade I historic building.

Festivals
Two temples have a marine parade to celebrate the Tin Hau Festival: Tin Hau Temple on Leung Shuen Wan (High Island) and Tin Hau Temple on Tap Mun, which has it once every ten years.

The celebration at Tin Hau Temple, Joss House Bay is attended annually by upwards of 40,000 to 50,000 people. Another large celebration takes place at the Tai Shu Ha temple in Yuen Long District.

Guardian Gods

In the larger Chinese temples, the statues of two Guardian Gods may be found on either side of the main altar. In the case of Tin Hau temples, such guards are always the two daemon brothers Chin Lei Ngan and Shun Fung Yi.

List by district

Note 1: Unless otherwise noted, typically in italics, Tin Hau is the main deity of the temples listed below.Note 2: A territory-wide grade reassessment of historic buildings is ongoing. The grades listed in the table are based on this update (6 December 2018). The temples with a "Not listed" status in the table below are not graded and do not appear in the list of historic buildings considered for grading.

Eastern District

Islands District

Kowloon City District

Kwai Tsing District

Kwun Tong District

North District

Sai Kung District

Sha Tin District

Sham Shui Po District

Southern District

Tai Po District

Tsuen Wan District

Tuen Mun District

Wan Chai District

Wong Tai Sin District

Yau Tsim Mong District

Yuen Long District

See also
 Hip Tin temples in Hong Kong
 Kwan Tai temples in Hong Kong
 List of Mazu temples around the world
 Places of worship in Hong Kong
 Qianliyan & Shunfeng'er

References

External links